Wang Yubo (born January 1963) is a Chinese politician, serving since November 2020 as the Governor of the Yunnan Province.

Biography 
Wang was born in Zhenping County, Henan. he graduated from Qinghai Normal University with a bachelor's degree in 1984, majoring Chinese Language & Literature. In the same year, he joined the Communist Party. He had been served as the Deputy Director-general of the Science and Technology Department of Qinghai Province (2000–2003), Deputy Secretary-general of the Qinghai Government (2003–2008), Director-general of the Education Department of Qinghai (2008–2012), Mayor of Xining (2012–2015), Secretary-general of CPC Standing Committee of Qinghai (2015–2017), and Deputy Governor of Qinghai (2017–2019).

Wang was appointed as the Deputy CPC Secretary of Yunnan in June 2019. He was named the acting Governor in November 2020.  He was elected as the Governor in January 2021.

Wang is a delegate to the 12th and 13th National People's Congress.

Reference 

1963 births
Living people
Qinghai Normal University alumni
Central Party School of the Chinese Communist Party alumni
People from Zhenping County, Henan
Chinese Communist Party politicians from Henan
Governors of Yunnan
Delegates to the 13th National People's Congress
Delegates to the 12th National People's Congress
Delegates to the National People's Congress from Yunnan